Mykola Romanovych Sikach (born 21 September 1991) is a Ukrainian professional footballer who plays as a left-back.

References

External links
 
 

1991 births
Living people
Ukrainian footballers
Association football defenders
FC Chornohora Ivano-Frankivsk players
FC Pokuttia Kolomyia players
FC Prykarpattia Ivano-Frankivsk (1998) players
Ukrainian First League players
Sportspeople from Ivano-Frankivsk Oblast